Coast to Coast is a restaurant chain based in the United Kingdom specialising in American foods. The company was established in 2011, when the first restaurant was opened at Brighton Marina. At the beginning of 2020 there were 13 restaurants open across the United Kingdom, but, as of July 2021, only the restaurant located in the Trafford Centre, Manchester, remains open, due to closures resulting from the COVID-19 pandemic in the United Kingdom. Coast to Coast is run by the Restaurant Group, who also own Chiquito and Frankie & Benny's. In March 2012, Coast to Coast won the New Concept Award at the Menu Innovation and Development Awards (MIDAS). 

The restaurants branded Filling Station are the equivalent in Scotland, and are also run by the Restaurant Group.

References

External links

Restaurant groups in the United Kingdom